Kuteb (also known as Kutep) also known as Ati, Kutev, Mbarike is a Nigerian ethnic language. The Kuteb people mostly live in the southern part of Taraba state in Nigeria, with a thousand-or-so speakers across the border in Cameroon. In Nigeria, it is spoken mostly in Takum and Ussa LGAs, and Yangtu SDA Taraba State.

Phonology 
In Kuteb, there are 27 consonant phonemes, 12 vowels, and five tones.

Vowels 
In Kuteb, there are two different sets of vowels, oral, and nasal. Phonemically, each set has six different vowels. In total, there are 12 separate phonemes. The status of ɨ being a phoneme in Kuteb is uncertain. This phoneme only occurs in closed syllables, some noun prefixes, and in verbal reduplication where there is neutralization of u and i.

Consonants 
Kuteb has 27 different consonant phonemes. The italicized entries are found in common loan words, or, in the case of /v/ and /z/, subdialectical variation. Like most Jukunoid languages, Kuteb has velarized consonants. In one study, these are included not as modifications on the base-phoneme, but as their own separate sound.

Tones 
In Kuteb, there are either four or five different tones, depending on how they are counted. The tones that are accepted by multiple studies are the low (unmarked), mid (¯), high (´), and falling (ˆ) tones.

Arguments 
According to Roger Blench, there are five different tones in Kuteb, these are: low (unmarked), mid (¯), high (´),  falling (ˆ), and rising (ˇ). The fifth tone, (rising) is only created through sandhi changes that affect some vocabulary after an "upstep". According to W.E. Welmers, this sandhi change does not occur, and if it did, only the pronunciation would change, not the written diacritic as well.

Phonotactics

Syllabic boundaries 
In Kutep, like in other Jukunoid languages, most consonantal phonemes can either be labialized or palatal. If these changes are taken to be consonantal phonemic clusters, the syllabic boundaries are as follows:

Sandhi changes 
The letter ⟨w⟩ in the Kuteb language retains its status as a voiced labio-velar approximant, as in uwé ‘face’ or in wōm ‘dry’ - though, when ⟨w⟩ is included in clusters with a palatal consonant (/c, j, sh, nj/) /w/, due to sandhi changes, becomes a voiced or voiceless labiodental release.

Distribution of consonants 
In Kuteb, there are many consonant clusters that can exist, though, most of these occur between word boundaries, though, some of these do occur in single-syllable isolation - these syllables are listed below. Theoretically though, any combination of syllable-final consonants (see below) followed by any syllable-initial consonant is possible. It is likely, however, that reduction would occur, as in the word ushitong ‘soup-stirrer’ (from shir and utoŋ) in which the /r/ has been dropped. Also, when final ⟨nn⟩  stems precede stems beginning with ⟨n⟩, the double ⟨nn⟩+⟨n⟩ is reduced to just ⟨n⟩. This effect can be shown in words such as munae (munn-náe) ‘be abundant’, and in munji (munn-nji) ‘forget’.

In CV positions, the following consonants are used:
 p ts t c k   b (d) (g)    mb nd nj ŋg    f s sh h   v z   nz     m n ŋ   r l
While in C(C)VC final positions, the following are used instead:
 b r g m n* ŋ*
And the following are used in CC clusters:
 With Cw: pw, mbw, bw, fw, mw, sw (?), cw, njw, jw, shw, kw, ngw, and ŋw 
 With Cy: py, mby
 With Ck: pk, tk, fk, sk
 With Cg: mbg, ndg

Consonant clusters 
In 1964, Peter Ladefoged recorded the phonetics of multiple West African languages. One of these languages was Kuteb, and these were his findings:

Notes

References

External links 
http://www.koeppe.de/titel_details.php?id=514
https://web.archive.org/web/20120405160934/http://lingweb.eva.mpg.de/numeral/Kuteb.htm
http://www.koeppe.de/titel_details_print.php?id=514
http://globalrecordings.net/en/language/1757
The Recapitulating Pronouns in Kuteb

Jukunoid languages
Languages of Nigeria
Languages of Cameroon